South Middle School may refer to:

 South Middle School (West Virginia)
 South Middle School (Illinois)
 South Middle School in Eau Claire, Wisconsin and is one of the three middle schools there.
 South Middle School in Liberal, Kansas that is one of the two middle schools there.
 South Middle School (Braintree, Massachusetts), Braintree, Massachusetts
 South Middle School (Lancaster, South Carolina), Lancaster, South Carolina